Christopher Teichmann (born 13 October 1995) is a German-Swiss professional footballer who plays as a midfielder for Baden.

Career
Born in Germany, Teichmann made his professional debut for FC Aarau of the Swiss Super League on 13 July 2013 against FC Basel in the opening match of the season, in which he started and played 76 minutes as Aarau lost the match 3–1. 

On 7 January 2016, Teichmann announced his retirement from professional football to concentrate on his education. He resumed his playing career in the summer of 2016.

Career statistics

References

External links 
 FC Aarau Profile.

1995 births
Living people
Swiss men's footballers
Switzerland youth international footballers
Association football midfielders
FC Aarau players
FC Baden players
BSC Old Boys players
SC Young Fellows Juventus players
2. Liga Interregional players
Swiss 1. Liga (football) players
Swiss Super League players
Swiss Promotion League players
Swiss Challenge League players